Sympetalistis is a genus of moths of the family Yponomeutidae.

Species
Sympetalistis petrograpta - Meyrick, 1935 

Yponomeutidae